The Saxony-Anhalt Cup (German: Landespokal Sachsen-Anhalt) is an annual football cup competition in Saxony-Anhalt. The Football Association of Saxony-Anhalt (German: Fußballverband Sachsen-Anhalts, short: FSA) is its governing body. All non-professional sides that are members of the FSA may participate. Winners of the Saxony-Anhalt Cup will start in the first round of the DFB Cup. The cup final was played in Paul Greifzu Stadium in Dessau from 1998 to 2005. Since then it has been played in Schönebeck (Elbe) in 2006, and in the newly built Stadion Magdeburg since 2007. The cup is played in a one-leg mode, with extra time and penalty shoot-out when necessary. The teams share the revenue from the respective matches, and in the cup final, the Football Association also receives a share.
The cup has been played since 1991. Record winners are 1. FC Magdeburg with 12 titles, two of which were won by the club's reserve team. It is one of the 21 regional cup competitions in Germany.

FSA Cup and Lotto Cup

History
Since the establishment of the Football Association of Saxony-Anhalt in 1991 the cup has been played. However, there have been several reforms that changed the character of the competition. Until the 1993/94 two separate cup competitions were played in the areas formerly occupied by the Bezirke Magdeburg and Halle. The two champions of these Bezirkspokale then faced each other in the Saxony-Anhalt Cup final.

From the 1994/95 season onwards the cup has been played as one competition with all teams down to the Landesklasse (tier VII) and the winners of the Kreispokal competitions participating. This led to up to 160 teams and 8 cup rounds to determine the winner.

In 2000/01 there was another reform to reduce the number of games. Since then all teams from the Regionalliga, NOFV-Oberliga, Verbandsliga Sachsen-Anhalt, the top five teams of the three Landesliga divisions (tier VI until 2007/08, tier VII from 2008/09) and the 14 Kreispokal winners are eligible for the cup.

Through a sponsorship agreement the competition has been called Lottopokal since the 2006–07 season.

Finals

Record winners

Notes

References

External links
Official site of the FSA Cup

Recurring sporting events established in 1991
Football cup competitions in Germany
Football competitions in Saxony-Anhalt
1991 establishments in Germany